Adalı (Turkish for "islander" or "with islands") may refer to:

Surname
 Kutlu Adalı (1935–1996), Turkish Cypriot journalist, poet, socio-political researcher and peace advocate

Places
 Adalı, Bigadiç, a village
 Adalı, Kahta, a village in Kahta district of Adıyaman Province, Turkey
 Adalı, Karataş, a village in Karataş district of Adana Province, Turkey